The Hadean is a geologic eon of Earth history preceding the Archean. On Earth, the Hadean coincides with the planet's formation about 4.54 billion years ago The start of the Hadean is now defined as (4567.30 ± 0.16) Ma set by the age of the oldest solid material in the Solar System, found in some meteorites, about 4.567 billion years old). The Hadean ended, as defined by the International Commission on Stratigraphy (ICS), 4 billion years ago.

Hadean rocks are very rare, largely consisting of zircons from one locality in Western Australia. Hadean geophysical models remain controversial among geologists: it appears that plate tectonics and the growth of continents may have started in the Hadean. Earth in the early Hadean had a very thick carbon dioxide atmosphere, but eventually oceans of liquid water formed.

Etymology
"Hadean" (from Hades, the Greek god of the underworld, and the underworld itself) describes the hellish conditions then prevailing on Earth: the planet had just formed and was still very hot owing to its recent accretion, the abundance of short-lived radioactive elements, and frequent collisions with other Solar System bodies.

The term was coined by American geologist Preston Cloud, after the Greek mythical underworld Hades, originally to label the period before the earliest-known rocks on Earth. W. Brian Harland later coined an almost synonymous term, the Priscoan Period, from priscus, the Latin word for 'ancient'. Other, older texts refer to the eon as the Pre-Archean.

Subdivisions

Since few geological traces of this eon remain on Earth, there is no official subdivision. However, the lunar geologic timescale embraces several major divisions relating to the Hadean, so these are sometimes used in an informal sense to refer to the same time intervals on Earth.

The lunar divisions are:

In 2010, an alternative scale was proposed that includes the addition of the Chaotian and Prenephelean eons preceding the Hadean and divides the Hadean into three eras with two periods each. The Paleohadean Era consists of the Hephaestean period and the Jacobian period (4.4-4.3 Ga). The Mesohadean is divided into the Canadian (4.3-4.2 Ga) and the Procrustean periods (4.2-4.1 Ga). The Neohadean is divided into the Acastan (4.1-4.0 Ga) and the Promethean periods (4.0-3.9 Ga). , this has not been adopted by the IUGS.

Rock dating

In the last decades of the 20th-century geologists identified a few Hadean rocks from western Greenland, northwestern Canada, and Western Australia. In 2015, traces of carbon minerals interpreted as "remains of biotic life" were found in 4.1-billion-year-old rocks in Western Australia.

The oldest dated zircon crystals, enclosed in a metamorphosed sandstone conglomerate in the Jack Hills of the Narryer Gneiss Terrane of Western Australia, date to 4.404 ± 0.008 Ga. This zircon is a slight outlier, with the oldest consistently-dated zircon falling closer to 4.35 Ga—around 200 million years after the hypothesized time of Earth's formation.

In many other areas, xenocryst (or relict) Hadean zircons enclosed in older rocks indicate that younger rocks have formed on older terranes and have incorporated some of the older material. One example occurs in the Guiana shield from the Iwokrama Formation of southern Guyana where zircon cores have been dated at 4.22 Ga.

Atmosphere
A sizable quantity of water would have been in the material that formed Earth. Water molecules would have escaped Earth's gravity more easily when it was less massive during its formation. Hydrogen and helium are expected to continually escape (even to the present day) due to atmospheric escape.

Part of the ancient planet is theorized to have been disrupted by the impact that created the Moon, which should have caused the melting of one or two large regions of Earth. Earth's present composition suggests that there was not complete remelting as it is difficult to completely melt and mix huge rock masses. However, a fair fraction of material should have been vaporized by this impact. The material would have condensed within 2000 years, leaving behind hot volatiles which probably resulted in a heavy  atmosphere with hydrogen and water vapor.

Oceans

Studies of zircons have found that liquid water may have existed between 4.0 and 4.4 billion years ago, very soon after the formation of Earth. Liquid water oceans existed despite the high surface temperature, because at an atmospheric pressure of 27 atmospheres, water is still liquid.

Asteroid impacts during the Hadean and into the Archean would have periodically disrupted the ocean. However, the frequency of meteorite impacts is still under study: the Earth may have gone through long periods when liquid oceans and life were possible.

Plate tectonics

A 2008 study of zircons found that Australian Hadean rock contains minerals pointing to the existence of plate tectonics as early as 4 billion years ago (approximately 600 million years after Earth's formation). However, some geologists suggest that the zircons could have been formed by meteorite impacts. The direct evidence of Hadean geology from zircons is limited, because the zircons are largely gathered in one locality in Australia. Geophysical models are underconstrained, but can paint a general picture of the state of Earth in the Hadean.

Mantle convection in the Hadean was likely vigorous, due to lower viscosity. The lower viscosity was due to the high levels of radiogenic heat and the fact that water in the mantle had not yet fully outgassed. Whether the vigorous convection led to plate tectonics in the Hadean or was confined under a rigid lid is still a matter of debate. The presence of Hadean oceans are thought to trigger plate tectonics.

Subduction due to plate tectonics would have removed carbonate from the early oceans, contributing to the removal of the -rich early atmosphere. Removal of this early atmosphere is evidence of Hadean plate tectonics.

If plate tectonics occurred in the Hadean, it would have formed continental crust. Different models predict different amounts of continental crust during the Hadean. The work of Dhiume et al. predicts that by the end of the Hadean, the continental crust had only 25% of today's area. The models of Korenaga, et al. predict that the continental crust grew to present-day volume sometime between 4.0 and 4.2 Gya.

Continents
The amount of exposed land in the Hadean is only loosely dependent on the amount of continental crust: it also depends on the ocean level. In models where plate tectonics started in the Archean, Earth has a global ocean in the Hadean. The high heat of the mantle may have made it difficult to support high elevations in the Hadean. If continents did form in the Hadean, their growth competed with outgassing of water from the mantle. Continents may have appeared in the mid-Hadean, and then disappeared under a thick ocean by the end of the Hadean. The limited amount of land has implications for the origin of life.

See also
 
 
 Formation and evolution of the Solar System
 
  – the first sections describe the formation of Earth

References

Further reading

External links

Peripatus.nz: Description of the Hadean Era
Hadean (chronostratigraphy scale)

 
Precambrian geochronology